The Verwaltungsgemeinschaft Mainburg (English: Mainburg administrative partnership) lies in Kelheim, a district in Lower Bavaria, Germany.

In Germany, a Verwaltungsgemeinschaft is an agreement or partnership between neighbouring municipalities (Gemeinde) of a district (Kreis) to co-operate on certain matters, e.g. planning, sanitation or education.

The Mainburg partnership is composed of the following municipalities:
Aiglsbach, 1,647 residents, 39.97 km²
Attenhofen, 1,360 residents, 31.48 km²
Elsendorf, 2,049 residents, 32.66 km²
Volkenschwand, 1,616 residents, 29.24 km²

The partnership is based in Mainburg, although the town itself is not a member of the partnership.

Kelheim (district)